Balclutha may refer to:

 Balclutha (1886), a sailing ship built in 1886 and now preserved in San Francisco, California
 Balclutha (genus), a leafhopper genus in the tribe Macrostelini
 Balclutha, New Zealand, a town in the Otago region of New Zealand
 Sir Charles Cameron, 1st Baronet (1841–1924), Scottish doctor, newspaper editor and politician
 A small, short-lived settlement that occupied some of the same area as Louisa, Kentucky